Eileen Mabel Elizabeth Way (2 September 1911 – 16 June 1994) was a British actress who appeared in film and television roles in a career dating back to the 1930s.  She trained at the Royal Academy of Dramatic Art from the age of 16.

She was in some of the first productions of Tennessee Williams' plays in Great Britain, including playing the role of the Mexican Woman in A Streetcar Named Desire, and appeared at the Bristol Old Vic and Nottingham Playhouse.

She appeared in the TV series Doctor Who, in the serials An Unearthly Child (as Old Mother, the programme's first on-screen death) and The Creature from the Pit (as Karela), as well as in the 1966 film Daleks' Invasion Earth 2150 A.D. (as Old Woman), based on the serial The Dalek Invasion of Earth (1964). She also appeared in the second series of Poldark (1977) as Aunt Agatha; Century Falls; Upstairs, Downstairs; By the Sword Divided; Inspector Morse; Bergerac; and ''Ripping Yarns.

She was married to the psychiatrist Felix Warden Brown.

Filmography

Film

Television

References

External links

1911 births
1994 deaths
20th-century English actresses
Actresses from Surrey
English film actresses
English television actresses
Alumni of RADA